David Joseph Braithwaite  (16 April 1937 – 18 March 2021) was a New Zealand politician. He was mayor of Hamilton from 2001 to 2004.

Braithwaite was born in Hamilton on 16 April 1937. Both of his parents were prominent in civic life in Hamilton. His father, Roderick Braithwaite, served as mayor of Hamilton, between 1953 and 1959; and his mother, Kathleen Braithwaite (née Arey), was a city councillor from 1962 to 1974, including a period as deputy mayor.

In the 1992 Queen's Birthday Honours, Braithwaite was appointed an Officer of the Order of the British Empire, for services to the Trustbank organisation and the community.

Braithwaite died in Hamilton on 18 March 2021, aged 83.

References

1937 births
2021 deaths
Mayors of Hamilton, New Zealand
New Zealand Officers of the Order of the British Empire
David